Scotia Plaza is a commercial skyscraper in the city of Toronto, Ontario, Canada. It is in the financial district of the downtown core bordered by Yonge Street on the east, King Street West on the south, Bay Street on the west, and Adelaide Street West on the north. At , Scotia Plaza is Canada's third tallest skyscraper and the 22nd tallest building in North America. It is connected to the PATH network, and contains  of office space on 68 floors and 40 retail stores.

Olympia and York developed the complex as an expansion of the adjacent headquarters of Scotiabank and the bank continues to occupy approximately 24 floors of the structure. Olympia and York owned the complex from its completion until the company was liquidated due to overwhelming debt in 1993. Scotiabank led a consortium of banks to purchase the mortgage for Scotia Plaza and over the next five years, it purchased additional shares from its partners until it was the property's majority owner.

On January 19, 2012, Scotiabank announced it would sell the iconic building and on May 22, announced a final agreement with Dundee Real Estate Investment Trust (now Dream Office REIT) and H&R Real Estate Investment Trust for $1.27 billion, making it the last of Canada's major banks to divest ownership of its Toronto headquarters property.  In 2016, H&R and Dream sold 50% of the building to KingSett Capital and AIMCo; in 2017, Dream sold its remaining 50% stake in 2017 to the same two companies.

Architecture
The tower incorporates the historic Beaux-Arts Bank of Nova Scotia Building at 44 King Street West, by architects Mathers and Haldenby with Beck and Eadie, built between 1946 and 1951 on the site of Cawthra House. The , 27-storey structure was designated as significant under the Ontario Heritage Act by the City of Toronto in 1975 and was renovated with a historically-sensitive design that includes a 14-storey glass atrium connecting it to the new structure. The atrium houses a large banking hall incorporating architectural features from both the historic and modern components of the complex and includes a  large, metal structure referred to as the Circle of the Provinces which houses the teller services for the Bank of Nova Scotia's main branch.

WZMH Architects designed the modern tower which was built between 1985 and 1988. Excavation for the tower extended , the deepest for a building in Canada's history. The tower consists of 68 storeys above ground and 6 storeys below ground with a parallelogram floorplan. Red Napoleon Granite, quarried in Sweden, cut and polished in Italy, then imported to Canada, covers much of the exterior and many interior surfaces. Windows are dark tinted glass framed by the granite. The north and south facades follow a step profile giving many floors over 12 desirable corner offices. The east and west façades feature a deeply recessed, stepped-chevron extending between floors 56 and 68. The area within the chevron is covered with the same glass in metal frames, creating a visual void. Instead of a steel skeleton to bear structural loads, the tower employs high strength reinforced concrete. The tower's two low-rise wings extend east to 104 Yonge Street and north to 11 Adelaide Street West. The Adelaide wing incorporates the historic façade of the Wood Gundy Building, previously located at 40 King Street West, and Yonge Street wing incorporates the Dunfield Building.

Essential to the project during construction was maintaining the Bank of Nova Scotia's head office and Toronto Main banking Branch functions with minimal disruption throughout the eight-year, two-phase construction. The tower's project and construction managers were Goldie-Burgess Ltd., followed by W. Tamm Consulting Limited.

Scotiabank's vault of gold and other bullion is below Scotia Plaza.

See also
List of tallest buildings in Toronto
List of tallest buildings in Canada
Tour Scotia in Montreal
Scotia Place in Edmonton

References

External links

 Scotia Plaza

Bank headquarters in Canada
Office buildings completed in 1951
Office buildings completed in 1988
Skyscrapers in Toronto
PATH (Toronto)
Postmodern architecture in Canada
Scotiabank
WZMH Architects buildings
Skyscraper office buildings in Canada
Retail buildings in Canada
Leadership in Energy and Environmental Design gold certified buildings
1988 establishments in Ontario